D218 is a state road in Lika region of Croatia connecting Užljebić border crossing to Croatian highway network.

Until 2020, the southern part of the road went between Donji Lapac and Bruvno, when it was redesignated to go between Donji Lapac and Bjelopolje.

The road, as well as all other state roads in Croatia, is managed and maintained by Hrvatske ceste, a state-owned company.

Traffic volume 

Traffic is regularly counted and reported by Hrvatske ceste (HC), operator of the road.

Road junctions and populated areas

Maps

Sources

State roads in Croatia
Lika-Senj County
Transport in Zadar County